Yoddha: The Warrior, or simply Yodha is a 1992 Indian Malayalam-language fantasy action film directed by Sangeeth Sivan and written by Sasidharan Arattuvazhi. Mohanlal plays the lead role of Thaiparambil Ashokan, the saviour destined to rescue the Rimpoche of a Nepalese Buddhist monastery from sorcerers practicing black magic. The ensemble supporting cast include Jagathy Sreekumar, Siddharth Lama, Puneet Issar, Madhoo, and Urvashi.

The original songs and background score were composed by A. R. Rahman. Santosh Sivan was the cinematographer and A. Sreekar Prasad edited the film. Saga Films produced and distributed the film. Yoddha was released in India on 3 September 1992. It was later dubbed and released in other regional Indian languagesDharam Yoddha (1993) in Hindi, Ashokan (1993) in Tamil, and Yoddha (1995) in Telugu. The film won four Kerala State Film Awards for Best Child Artist (Lama), Best Editor (Prasad), Best Sound Recordist (Arun K. Bose), and Best Male Singer (M. G. Sreekumar).

Plot 
In an unknown location on the Himalayan Nepal, a mystical boy is about to be crowned the Rimpoche (Siddharth Lama) of a Buddhist monastery, when a gang of sorcerers led by Vishaka (Puneet Issar), abduct the child. Vishaka is in service to a mysterious enchantress, who needs to make a human sacrifice of the Rimpoche to attain invincibility, to be performed before the solar eclipse. The monks expect the advent of a saviour, the man with ears as a weapon, across the Himalayas to rescue the child as they are prophesied. In the meantime, Rimpoche manages to escape through the course and reaches Kathmandu.

At the other end of the subcontinent, in a village in Kerala, Ashokan (Mohanlal), a youngster spent his time competing with his cousin Appukuttan (Jagathy Sreekumar) in a series of games conducted by a sports club. Appukuttan finds himself on the losing side each time, but strongly optimistic of his win, he competes again. Appukuttan feels fooled and heartbroken when he suspects an affair brewing between Ashokan and his fiancée Dhamayanthi (Urvashi). Ashokan is sent to his uncle Capt. Kuttikrishna Menon a.k.a Kuttimama (M. S. Thripunithura) in Nepal by his mother Sumathi Amma (Sukumari) after a palm reader predicts that he will commit murder if he stays in Kerala. Unbeknownst to Ashokan, Appukuttan flees to Nepal beforehand and masquerades as Ashokan before their uncle. Ashokan, in turn, is cast out onto the streets, where he meets the boy and forms a bond with him.

Kuttimama's daughter, Aswathi (Madhoo), is a researcher into Nepalese traditions and history. As a payback to Ashokan, Appukuttan attempts to plot his way into marrying her, who in turn is Ashokan's bride-to-be by their custom, but not engaged. Ashokan, with Unnikuttan's (as he calls the boy) assistance, manages to cast doubt into the mind of uncle about the credibility of Appukuttan's claims and wins over Aswathi's love and trust.

Ashokan and Aswathi witness one of the sorcerers' confederate combatants kidnapping the boy. Upon following him into a forest, they end up confronting Vishaka. In an ensuing fight, Vishaka grievously wounds Aswathi and blinds Ashokan using a substance, and leaves the two to die. Ashokan is rescued by a tribe affiliated with the monks that train warriors tasked with protecting the monastery. Ashokan is discovered as the "chosen one" and is given training in Kung Fu by a master, to overcome his blindness and enhance his hearing skills. At the same time, Appukuttan was also captured by another evil tribe while following the two.

Ashokan, now enlisted as a warrior, infiltrates the sorcerer's location and rescues Unnikuttan from a bewitched sheathe. The boy then, aided by an ailing old monk, restores Ashokan's eyesight. As the solar eclipse nears, the monks begin the coronation ceremony of the boy. Vishaka rushes to the monastery to terminate it. But Ashokan stands in his way and, in a climactic fight, kills him. The boy is crowned as the Rimpoche. Ashokan discovers that Aswathi was indeed saved by tribes, and is alive and healthy. Appukuttan returns as Ashokan-esque trained warrior, but before he could stand a chance, he is subdued by Ashokan in a friendly manner .

Cast 

 Mohanlal as Thaipparambil Ashokan/Akkusota(called by Unnikuttan)
 Siddharth Lama as Rimpoche / Unnikuttan
 Puneet Issar as Vishaka
 Jagathy Sreekumar as Arassumoottil Appukuttan
 Madhoo as Aswathi
 Urvashi as Dhamayanthi
 M. S. Thripunithura as Capt. Kuttikrishnan Menon (Kuttimama)
 Oduvil Unnikrishnan as Gopalan Menon, Appukuttan's Father
 Jagannatha Varma as Raghavan Menon, Ashokan's father
 Sukumari as Sumathi, Ashokan's mother
 Meena as Lathika, Appukuttan's mother
 Gopal Bhutani as Ashokan's trainer
 Yubaraj Lama as Sorcerer's confederate combatant
 Subair as Mohan, Ashokan's motivator
 Beena Antony as Ashokan's sister
 Nandhu as Santhosh, Ashokan's friend
 Vineeth Anil as Vikru, Ashokan's hometown buddy
 Priyanka as a girl in kabbadi crowd

Production
Siddharth Lama debuted in the film playing Rimpoche. His father Yubaraj Lama also acted in the film as the long-haired henchman, an abductor sent by Puneet Issar's villain character. Cinematographer Santhosh Sivan found Siddharth Lama accidentally, who happened to see him when he visited actor Yubaraj Lama. At the time, they were searching for a suitable child actor to play the role of Rimpoche. Sivan invited "little" Lama to the film, who without hesitation said, yes. While filming, Lama shaved his head at least 20 times for the film. Every three days he had to shave.

Ashokan's arrival scene at the Nepal airport was shot at the Tribhuvan International Airport in Kathmandu. The house shown in the film as the residence of Kuttymama in Nepal was originally a hotel named Astoria (it was since then converted into a school). The Swayambhu architecture situated atop a hill in the Kathmandu Valley was a significant filming location, some comedy scenes between Mohanlal and Sreekumar was shot there on its steps elevating to the Buddha statue. The jacket worn by Mohanlal in the Nepal scenes was an indigenous fashion at the time, called the Butterfly Jacket. Some sequences were filmed inside a cave called the Bat Cave in Pokhara, a tourist attraction. Baring a few scenes shot in Palakkad, the film was completely shot in Nepal.

Music

The film's original songs and background score were composed by A. R. Rahman; the lyrics for the songs were by Bichu Thirumala. Yoddha was the second film of Rahman after Roja (1992). He was working on Roja when he signed Yoddha. Rahman has then already attained fame across South India for composing successful jingles for advertisement films, who was then known by the name Dileep. Sangeeth decided to experiment with Rahman as the composer, he was impressed with Rahman's musical arrangement for a candy commercial he directed, he also liked his composition of "Chinna Chinna Asai" for Roja, which Rahman showed him while he was in his studio.

The song "Padakaali" is featured in the backdrop of a singing competition between Ashokan and Appukuttan in a temple, with both of them dissing each other with words. The song's situation in the story was briefed to lyricist Thirumala by Sivan while they were in Rahman's Panchathan Record Inn studio in Chennai. After hearing it, Hindu goddess Kali's image was the first thing that came into his mind. He thought that a hymn describing Kali's furious persona would suit the situation. He referred to the book Mahakshetrangalude Munnil by Nalankal Krishna Pillai for reference, from which he got words such as padakali, porkali, chandi, maargini among others, to use in the lyrics, padakali and chandi are synonyms for goddess Kali. Since it was a comical song, it was not expected to have deep words, though Thirumala was particular that the words should not be meaningless, and most of the words he added were relating to religious worshiping. It is one of the all-time popular songs in Malayalam film music.

Apart from the original Malayalam version, the soundtrack was also released in Tamil (as Asokan), Hindi (as Dharam Yoddha) and Telugu (as Yoddha). The respective soundtracks featured versions of all songs except "Mamboove", which was not featured in the film. "Mamboove" was later reused for the Tamil movie Pavithra as "Sevvanam". The lyrics were written by Vairamuthu, P. K. Mishra and Veturi respectively for the Tamil, Hindi and Telugu versions. The Hindi version was added with five songs composed by Pappu Khan, none of which was featured in the film. The original soundtrack was released by Tharangini in 1992. The Tamil dubbed version, Asokan by Pyramid in 1994, the Hindi version by BMG Crescendo in 1996 and the Telugu version in 1995. The Hindi version was re-released in 1997 with five new songs added.

Track listing

Release
Yoddha was released in India on 3 September 1992. It was later dubbed and released in other regional Indian languages—Dharam Yodha (1993) in Hindi, Ashokan (1993) in Tamil, and Yoddha (1995) in Telugu.

Accolades

References

External links
 

1992 films
1990s Malayalam-language films
Films scored by A. R. Rahman
Films set in Nepal
Films shot in Nepal
Films shot in Kerala
Films shot in Palakkad
Films about magic
Films about witchcraft
Buddhism in fiction
Films about Buddhism
Films about telekinesis
Films set in forests
1990s martial arts comedy films
Indian martial arts films
Sword and sorcery films
Indian swashbuckler films
Kalarippayattu films
Kung fu films
Indian action comedy films
1990s adventure comedy films
Indian action adventure films
Films about blind people in India
Rinpoches
Fictional Buddhist monks
1992 action comedy films
1992 martial arts films
Films directed by Sangeeth Sivan
Films shot in Kathmandu
Films shot in Pokhara